Montmartre Abbey was a 12th-century Benedictine monastery established in the Montmartre district of Paris within the Diocese of Paris.

In 1133, King Louis VI purchased the  Merovingian church of Saint Peter of Montmartre in order to establish the abbey and in the process to rebuild the church. The restored church was consecrated by Pope Eugenius III in 1147, in a splendid royal ceremony during which Bernard of Clairvaux and Peter, Abbot of Cluny, acted as acolytes.

The abbey was suppressed in 1790, sold in 1794 and demolished during the French Revolution, but its church, Saint-Pierre de Montmartre, survived as the parish church of Montmartre, the oldest church in Paris, now all that remains of the abbey except for a vineyard.

See also
List of Benedictine monasteries in France

References

Benedictine monasteries in France
Order of Saint Benedict
Montmartre
Christian monasteries in Paris